The Lincoln Calibration Sphere 1, or LCS-1, is a large aluminium sphere in Earth orbit since 6 May 1965. It is still in use, having lasted for over 50 years. The sphere was launched along with the Lincoln Experimental Satellite-2 on a Titan IIIA. It is technically the oldest operational spacecraft , but it has no power supply or fuel; it is merely a passive metal sphere. LCS-1 has been used for radar calibration since its launch. It was built by Rohr. Corp. for the MIT Lincoln Laboratory.

The sphere was constructed from two hemispheres, made by spinning sheet metal over a mold. These hemispheres were fastened to an internal, circumferential hoop by 440 countersunk screws, then milled and polished. The initial finish had a surface roughness less than 10 micrometres and was expected to last for five years. Since its launch, I-band measurements have shown periodic deviations that likely correspond to one or more new surface irregularities.

Before being launched to orbit, the optical cross section of the LCS-1 was measured in L, S, C, X and K microwave bands. Four other spheres were also manufactured and measured for comparison to the one in orbit.

Notes

References

Satellites of the United States
Satellites orbiting Earth
Passive satellites
Spacecraft launched in 1965
Radar calibration satellites